Analog signature analysis is electronic component and circuit board troubleshooting technique which applies a current-limited AC sinewave across two points of an electronic component or circuit. 

The resulting current/voltage waveform is shown on a signature display using vertical deflection for current and horizontal deflection for voltage. This unique analog signature represents the overall health of the part being analyzed. By comparing the signatures of known good circuit boards to those of suspect boards, faulty nets and components can be quickly identified.

Analog Signature Analysis relies on a change in electrical characteristics to detect problems on a circuit board.

Other terms 
 ATE diagnostics
 Power off nodal impedance test
 Power-off testing
 Tracker signature analysis
 VI testing
 VI curves
 Voltage-versus-current display
 V/I trace test

Typical equipment 
 Flying probe
 Octopus
 VI interceptor
 V/I curve tracer
 Voltage/current curve tracer

Hardware testing
Nondestructive testing